Oakland is an unincorporated community and census-designated place (CDP) in northeastern Marion County, Arkansas, United States. Oakland has a post office with ZIP code 72661. The Oakland Campground on Bull Shoals Lake lies about three miles to the west at the end of Route 202. It was first listed as a CDP in the 2020 census, with a population of 72.

Mountain Home School District operates area public schools. The Oakland School District consolidated into the Mountain Home district on July 1, 1986.

Demographics

2020 census

Note: the US Census treats Hispanic/Latino as an ethnic category. This table excludes Latinos from the racial categories and assigns them to a separate category. Hispanics/Latinos can be of any race.

References

Unincorporated communities in Marion County, Arkansas
Unincorporated communities in Arkansas
Census-designated places in Arkansas
Census-designated places in Marion County, Arkansas